Eucera frater is a species of long-horned bee in the family Apidae. It is found in North America.

Subspecies
These three subspecies belong to the species Eucera frater:
 Eucera frater albopilosa (Fowler, 1899)
 Eucera frater frater (Cresson, 1878)
 Eucera frater lata (Provancher, 1888)

References

Further reading

 

Apinae
Articles created by Qbugbot
Insects described in 1878